Seaborgium (106Sg) is a synthetic element and so has no stable isotopes. A standard atomic weight cannot be given. The first isotope to be synthesized was 263mSg in 1974. There are 13 known radioisotopes from 258Sg to 271Sg and 2 known isomers (261mSg and 263mSg). The longest-lived isotope is 269Sg with a half-life of 14 minutes.

List of isotopes 

|-
| 258Sg
| style="text-align:right" | 106
| style="text-align:right" | 152
| 258.11298(44)#
| 3.3(10) ms[2.9(+13−7) ms]
| SF
| (various)
| 0+
|-
| 259Sg
| style="text-align:right" | 106
| style="text-align:right" | 153
| 259.11440(13)#
| 580(210) ms[0.48(+28−13) s]
| α
| 255Rf
| 1/2+#
|-
| rowspan=2|260Sg
| rowspan=2 style="text-align:right" | 106
| rowspan=2 style="text-align:right" | 154
| rowspan=2|260.114384(22)
| rowspan=2|3.8(8) ms
| SF (74%)
| (various)
| rowspan=2|0+
|-
| α (26%)
| 256Rf
|-
| rowspan=3|261Sg
| rowspan=3 style="text-align:right" | 106
| rowspan=3 style="text-align:right" | 155
| rowspan=3|261.115949(20)
| rowspan=3|230(60) ms
| α (98.1%)
| 257Rf
| rowspan=3|7/2+#
|-
| EC (1.3%)
| 261Db
|-
| SF (.6%)
| (various)
|-
| style="text-indent:1em" | 261mSg
| colspan="3" style="text-indent:2em" |
| 92 µs
| IC
| 261Sg
|
|-
| rowspan=2|262Sg
| rowspan=2 style="text-align:right" | 106
| rowspan=2 style="text-align:right" | 156
| rowspan=2|262.11634(4)
| rowspan=2|8(3) ms[6.9(+38−18) ms]
| SF (92%)
| (various)
| rowspan=2|0+
|-
| α (8%)
| 258Rf
|-
| 263Sg
| style="text-align:right" | 106
| style="text-align:right" | 157
| 263.11829(10)#
| 1.0(2) s
| α
| 259Rf
| 9/2+#
|-
| rowspan=2 style="text-indent:1em" | 263mSg
| rowspan=2 colspan="3" style="text-indent:2em" | 100(70)# keV
| rowspan=2|120 ms
| α (87%)
| 259Rf
| rowspan=2|3/2+#
|-
| SF (13%)
| (various)
|-
| 264Sg
| style="text-align:right" | 106
| style="text-align:right" | 158
| 264.11893(30)#
| 37 ms
| SF
| (various)
| 0+
|-
| 265Sg
| rowspan=2 style="text-align:right" | 106
| rowspan=2 style="text-align:right" | 159
| rowspan=2|265.12109(13)#
| 8(3) s
| α
| 261Rf
| 
|-
| 265mSg
| 16.2 s
| α
| 261Rf
|
|-
| 266Sg
| style="text-align:right" | 106
| style="text-align:right" | 160
| 266.12198(26)#
| 360 ms
| SF
| (various)
| 0+
|-
| rowspan=2|267Sg
| rowspan=2 style="text-align:right" | 106
| rowspan=2 style="text-align:right" | 161
| rowspan=2|267.12436(30)#
| rowspan=2|1.4 min
| SF (83%)
| (various)
| rowspan=2|
|-
| α (17%)
| 263Rf
|-
| 268Sg
| style="text-align:right" | 106
| style="text-align:right" | 162
| 268.12539(50)#
| ~11 s
| SF
| (various)
| 0+
|-
| 269Sg
| style="text-align:right" | 106
| style="text-align:right" | 163
| 269.12863(39)#
| 
| α
| 265Rf
|
|-
| rowspan=2|271Sg
| rowspan=2 style="text-align:right" | 106
| rowspan=2 style="text-align:right" | 165
| rowspan=2|271.13393(63)#
| rowspan=2|
| α (73%)
| 267Rf
| rowspan=2|3/2+#
|-
| SF (27%)
| (various)

Nucleosynthesis

Cold fusion
This section deals with the synthesis of nuclei of seaborgium by so-called "cold" fusion reactions. These are processes that create compound nuclei at low excitation energy (~10–20 MeV, hence "cold"), leading to a higher probability of survival from fission. The excited nucleus then decays to the ground state via the emission of one or two neutrons only.

208Pb(54Cr,xn)262−xSg (x=1,2,3)
The first attempt to synthesise seaborgium in cold fusion reactions was performed in September 1974 by a Soviet team led by G. N. Flerov at the Joint Institute for Nuclear Research at Dubna. They reported producing a 0.48 s spontaneous fission (SF) activity, which they assigned to the isotope 259Sg. Based on later evidence it was suggested that the team most likely measured the decay of 260Sg and its daughter 256Rf. The TWG concluded that, at the time, the results were insufficiently convincing.

The Dubna team revisited this problem in 1983–1984 and were able to detect a 5 ms SF activity assigned directly to 260Sg.

The team at GSI studied this reaction for the first time in 1985 using the improved method of correlation of genetic parent-daughter decays. They were able to detect261Sg (x=1) and 260Sg and measured a partial 1n neutron evaporation excitation function.

In December 2000, the reaction was studied by a team at GANIL, France; they were able to detect 10 atoms of 261Sg and 2 atoms of 260Sg to add to previous data on the reaction.

After a facility upgrade, the GSI team measured the 1n excitation function in 2003 using a metallic lead target. Of significance, in May 2003, the team successfully replaced the lead-208 target with more resistant lead(II) sulfide targets (PbS), which will allow more intense beams to be used in the future. They were able to measure the 1n,2n and 3n excitation functions and performed the first detailed alpha-gamma spectroscopy on the isotope 261Sg. They detected ~1600 atoms of the isotope and identified new alpha lines as well as measuring a more accurate half-life and new EC and SF branchings. Furthermore, they were able to detect the K X-rays from the daughter rutherfordium isotope for the first time. They were also able to provide improved data for 260Sg, including the tentative observation of an isomeric level. The study was continued in September 2005 and March 2006. The accumulated work on 261Sg was published in 2007. Work in September 2005 also aimed to begin spectroscopic studies on 260Sg.

The team at the LBNL recently restudied this reaction in an effort to look at the spectroscopy of the isotope 261Sg. They were able to detect a new isomer, 261mSg, decaying by internal conversion into the ground state. In the same experiment, they were also able to confirm a K-isomer in the daughter 257Rf, namely 257m2Rf.

207Pb(54Cr,xn)261−xSg (x=1,2)
The team at Dubna also studied this reaction in 1974 with identical results as for their first experiments with a lead-208 target. The SF activities were first assigned to 259Sg and later to 260Sg and/or 256Rf. Further work in 1983–1984 also detected a 5 ms SF activity assigned to the parent 260Sg.

The GSI team studied this reaction for the first time in 1985 using the method of correlation of genetic parent-daughter decays. They were able to positively identify259Sg as a product from the 2n neutron evaporation channel.

The reaction was further used in March 2005 using PbS targets to begin a spectroscopic study of the even-even isotope 260Sg.

206Pb(54Cr,xn)260−xSg
This reaction was studied in 1974 by the team at Dubna. It was used to assist them in their assignment of the observed SF activities in reactions using Pb-207 and Pb-208 targets. They were unable to detect any SF, indicating the formation of isotopes decaying primarily by alpha decay.

208Pb(52Cr,xn)260−xSg (x=1,2)
The team at Dubna also studied this reaction in their series of cold fusion reactions performed in 1974. Once again they were unable to detect any SF activities. The reaction was revisited in 2006 by the team at LBNL as part of their studies on the effect of the isospin of the projectile and hence the mass number of the compound nucleus on the yield of evaporation residues. They were able to identify 259Sg and 258Sg in their measurement of the 1n excitation function.

209Bi(51V,xn)260−xSg (x=2)
The team at Dubna also studied this reaction in their series of cold fusion reactions performed in 1974. Once again they were unable to detect any SF activities.
In 1994, the synthesis of seaborgium was revisited using this reaction by the GSI team, in order to study the new even-even isotope 258Sg. Ten atoms of 258Sg were detected and decayed by spontaneous fission.

Hot fusion
This section deals with the synthesis of nuclei of seaborgium by so-called "hot" fusion reactions. These are processes that create compound nuclei at high excitation energy (~40–50 MeV, hence "hot"), leading to a reduced probability of survival from fission and quasi-fission. The excited nucleus then decays to the ground state via the emission of 3–5 neutrons.

238U(30Si,xn)268−xSg (x=3,4,5,6)
This reaction was first studied by Japanese scientists at the Japan Atomic Energy Research Institute (JAERI) in 1998. They detected a spontaneous fission activity, which they tentatively assigned to the new isotope 264Sg or 263Db, formed by EC of 263Sg.
In 2006, the teams at GSI and LBNL both studied this reaction using the method of correlation of genetic parent-daughter decays. The LBNL team measured an excitation function for the 4n,5n and 6n channels, whilst the GSI team were able to observe an additional 3n activity. Both teams were able to identify the new isotope 264Sg, which decayed with a short lifetime by spontaneous fission.

248Cm(22Ne,xn)270−xSg (x=4?,5)
In 1993, at Dubna, Yuri Lazarev and his team announced the discovery of long-lived 266Sg and 265Sg produced in the 4n and 5n channels of this nuclear reaction following the search for seaborgium isotopes suitable for a first chemical study.
It was announced that 266Sg decayed by 8.57 MeV alpha-particle emission with a projected half-life of ~20 s, lending strong support to the stabilising effect of the Z=108,N=162 closed shells.
This reaction was studied further in 1997 by a team at GSI and the yield, decay mode and half-lives for 266Sg and 265Sg have been confirmed, although there are still some discrepancies. In the recent synthesis of 270Hs (see hassium), 266Sg was found to undergo exclusively SF with a short half-life (TSF = 360 ms). It is possible that this is the ground state, (266gSg) and that the other activity, produced directly, belongs to a high spin K-isomer, 266mSg, but further results are required to confirm this.

A recent re-evaluation of the decay characteristics of 265Sg and 266Sg has suggested that all decays to date in this reaction were in fact from265Sg, which exists in two isomeric forms. The first, 265aSg has a principal alpha-line at 8.85 MeV and a calculated half-life of 8.9 s, whilst265bSg has a decay energy of 8.70 MeV and a half-life of 16.2 s. Both isomeric levels are populated when produced directly. Data from the decay of269Hs indicates that 265bSg is produced during the decay of 269Hs and that 265bSg decays into the shorter-lived261gRf isotope. This means that the observation of 266Sg as a long-lived alpha emitter is retracted and that it does indeed undergo fission in a short time.

Regardless of these assignments, the reaction has been successfully used in the recent attempts to study the chemistry of seaborgium (see below).

249Cf(18O,xn)267−xSg (x=4)
The synthesis of seaborgium was first realized in 1974 by the LBNL/LLNL team. In their discovery experiment, they were able to apply the new method of correlation of genetic parent-daughter decays to identify the new isotope 263Sg. In 1975, the team at Oak Ridge were able to confirm the decay data but were unable to identify coincident X-rays in order to prove that seaborgium was produced. In 1979, the team at Dubna studied the reaction by detection of SF activities. In comparison with data from Berkeley, they calculated a 70% SF branching for 263Sg. The original synthesis and discovery reaction was confirmed in 1994 by a different team at LBNL.

Decay products
Isotopes of seaborgium have also been observed in the decay of heavier elements. Observations to date are summarised in the table below:

Chronology of isotope discovery

Isomerism

266Sg
Initial work identified an 8.63 MeV alpha-decaying activity with a half-life of ~21 s and assigned to the ground state of 266Sg. Later work identified a nuclide decaying by 8.52 and 8.77 MeV alpha emission with a half-life of ~21 s, which is unusual for an even-even nuclide. Recent work on the synthesis of 270Hs identified 266Sg decaying by SF with a short 360 ms half-life. The recent work on 277Cn and 269Hs has provided new information on the decay of 265Sg and 261Rf. This work suggested that the initial 8.77 MeV activity should be reassigned to 265Sg. Therefore, the current information suggests that the SF activity is the ground state and the 8.52 MeV activity is a high spin K-isomer. Further work is required to confirm these assignments. A recent re-evaluation of the data has suggested that the 8.52 MeV activity should be associated with 265Sg and that 266Sg only undergoes fission.

265Sg
The recent direct synthesis of 265Sg resulted in four alpha-lines at 8.94, 8.84, 8.76 and 8.69 MeV with a half-life of 7.4 seconds. The observation of the decay of 265Sg from the decay of 277Cn and 269Hs indicated that the 8.69 MeV line may be associated with an isomeric level with an associated half-life of ~ 20 s. It is plausible that this level is causing confusion between assignments of 266Sg and 265Sg since both can decay to fissioning rutherfordium isotopes.

A recent re-evaluation of the data has indicated that there are indeed two isomers, one with a principal decay energy of 8.85 MeV with a half-life of 8.9 s, and a second isomer that decays with energy 8.70 MeV with a half-life of 16.2 s.

263Sg
The discovery synthesis of 263Sg resulted in an alpha-line at 9.06 MeV. Observation of this nuclide by decay of 271gDs,271mDs and 267Hs has confirmed an isomer decaying by 9.25 MeV alpha emission. The 9.06 MeV decay was also confirmed. The 9.06 MeV activity has been assigned to the ground state isomer with an associated half-life of 0.3 s. The 9.25 MeV activity has been assigned to an isomeric level decaying with a half-life of 0.9 s.

Recent work on the synthesis of 271g,mDs was resulted in some confusing data regarding the decay of 267Hs. In one such decay, 267Hs decayed to 263Sg, which decayed by alpha emission with a half-life of ~ 6 s. This activity has not yet been positively assigned to an isomer and further research is required.

Spectroscopic decay schemes

261Sg

Retracted isotopes

269Sg
In the claimed synthesis of 293Og in 1999 the isotope 269Sg was identified as a daughter product. It decayed by 8.74 MeV alpha emission with a half-life of 22 s. The claim was retracted in 2001. This isotope was finally created in 2010.

Chemical yields of isotopes

Cold fusion
The table below provides cross-sections and excitation energies for cold fusion reactions producing seaborgium isotopes directly. Data in bold represents maxima derived from excitation function measurements. + represents an observed exit channel.

Hot fusion
The table below provides cross-sections and excitation energies for hot fusion reactions producing seaborgium isotopes directly. Data in bold represents maxima derived from excitation function measurements. + represents an observed exit channel.

References 

 Isotope masses from:

 Isotopic compositions and standard atomic masses from:

 Half-life, spin, and isomer data selected from the following sources.

 
Seaborgium
Seaborgium